Rollin' is a live album by jazz musician Freddie Hubbard recorded at the Theater Am Ring, Villingen Jazz Festival in Germany's Black Forest and released in 1982 on the MPS label. The album features performances by Hubbard with Dave Schnitter, William Childs, Larry Klein and Carl Burnett.

Reception
The Allmusic review by Scott Yanow states "the largely straightahead music is quite enjoyable and Hubbard's fans may want to search for this fairly rare item".

Track listing
 "One of Another Kind" - 7:38
 "Here's That Rainy Day" (Jimmy Van Heusen, Johnny Burke) - 6:23
 "Cascais" (Larry Klein) - 10:25
 "Up Jumped Spring" - 6:37
 "Byrdlike" - 6:38
 "Brigitte" - 4:35
 "Breaking Point" - 5:26
All compositions by Freddie Hubbard except as indicated
Recorded live, May 2, 1981, Theater Am Ring, Villingen Jazz Festival

Personnel
 Freddie Hubbard - trumpet, flugelhorn
 Dave Schnitter - tenor saxophone, soprano saxophone
 William Childs - piano, electric piano
 Larry Klein - bass, bass guitar
 Carl Burnett - drums

References

1982 live albums
Freddie Hubbard live albums
MPS Records live albums